Toupie is a French magazine for children 3 to 6 years of age. The magazine was established in 1985. It is part of Milan Presse, a division of Bayard Presse. The magazine is published on a monthly basis.

References

External links
 Official website

1985 establishments in France
Children's magazines published in France
French-language magazines
Monthly magazines published in France
Magazines established in 1985
Parenting magazines